Agelanthus longipes is a species of hemiparasitic plant in the family Loranthaceae, which is found in the Tanzania, Mozambique and Kenya.

Description 
A description of the plant is given in Govaerts et al., based on Polhill & Wiens (2006).

Habitat/ecology
A. longipes is found in lowland forests, Acacia woodland and coastal thickets.  There is no information about the hosts.

Threats 
Its coastal habitat is under threat from habitat conversion for agriculture, tourism infrastructure and urban expansion. In addition, Tanzanian forest reserves lack effective protection.

References

Flora of Tanzania
Flora of Kenya
Flora of Mozambique
longipes
Taxa named by John Gilbert Baker
Taxa named by Thomas Archibald Sprague